The Boca Grande Causeway is a causeway located in Charlotte County, Florida, connecting the community of Boca Grande on Gasparilla Island with the mainland near Placida. The  causeway crosses Gasparilla Sound and consists of three bridges, and is the only vehicular access to the island.

History

The Boca Grande Causeway originally opened in 1958 after six years of construction, replacing a vehicle ferry service. The causeway and its original bridges were built parallel to the now abandoned Charlotte Harbor and Northern Railway. Passenger rail service to the island was discontinued by the railroad shortly after the causeway opened. While the railroad was abandoned in 1981, the adjacent trestles remain mostly intact today and are visible from the causeway.

The Causeway was privately built, but was sold to the Gasparilla Island Bridge Authority, a government agency created to oversee operation of the causeway, in 1998. The northernmost bridge (connecting to the mainland) includes a  swing span over the navigation channel.

The current center and south bridges were completed in 2013. The current swing bridge was completed and opened to traffic in late 2015. The original bridges were replaced due to their age and functional obsolescence. The current bridges are taller and also include shoulders for bicycle traffic allowing improved access for bicyclists using the popular Boca Grande Bike Path better access to the mainland and to the Cape Haze Pioneer Trail.

Gallery

See also
List of bridges documented by the Historic American Engineering Record in Florida
Tom Adams Bridge

References

External links
Gasparilla Island Bridge Authority

Causeways in Florida
Swing bridges in the United States
Toll bridges in Florida
Roads in Charlotte County, Florida
Gasparilla Island
Steel bridges in the United States
Concrete bridges in the United States
Girder bridges in the United States
Historic American Engineering Record in Florida
Road bridges in Florida
Transportation buildings and structures in Charlotte County, Florida